The 1953 Italian Athletics Championships was the 43rd edition of the Italian Athletics Championships and were held in Rome from 25 to 27 September.

It was the first edition in which the men's and women's competitions took place in a single venue.

Champions

References

External links
 Italian Athletics Federation

Italian Athletics Championships
Athletics
Italian Athletics Outdoor Championships
Athletics competitions in Italy